ENASA (Empresa Nacional de Autocamiones S.A.) was a Spanish motor vehicle manufacturing company that was incorporated in 1946 after having bought the automotive assets of the Spanish Hispano-Suiza and the Italian Fiat in Spain. It produced trucks, buses and military armored vehicles under the Pegaso and, for a short while, Sava brands. ENASA belonged to INI, a Spanish state-owned industrial holding company.

From 1983, ENASA also owned Seddon Atkinson, which it received from International Harvester as compensation for a planned engine plant which had failed to materialize. International Harvester pulled out as the market for truck engines was contracting at the time, while there were also problems with Spain's admittance to the European Economic Community (EEC). In 1990 Enasa was sold to Iveco.

References

See also 
 Instituto Nacional de Industria
 Pegaso

Iveco
Vehicle manufacturing companies established in 1946
Vehicle manufacturing companies disestablished in 1990
1990 disestablishments in Spain
Spanish companies established in 1946